Nahr-e Salim (also Romanized as Nahr-e Salīm; also known as Salīm) is a village in Minubar Rural District, Arvandkenar District, Abadan County, Khuzestan Province, Iran. At the 2006 census, its population was 1,138, in 266 families.

References 

Populated places in Abadan County